The 1883 Minnesota gubernatorial election was held on November 6, 1883 to elect the governor of Minnesota.

Results

References

1883
Minnesota
gubernatorial
November 1883 events